Global Tamil Forum (GTF) is an International Tamil organization meant to further Tamil causes in Tamil areas of Sri Lanka. GTF supports self-determination for Tamils and wants justice for war crimes against Tamils. It is headed by S. J. Emmanuel. In UK it works with both Labour and Conservative Parties. It consists of Tamil organizations across the world.

References

External links
Global Tamil Forum website

Human rights organisations based in the United Kingdom
Overseas Tamil organizations
Sri Lankan Tamil politics
Sri Lankan Tamil nationalism
Tamil Eelam